Akkelpur is an upazila of Joypurhat District in the division of Rajshahi, Bangladesh.

Geography
It is the smallest upazila in Joypurhat Zila. It is bounded by Panchbibi upazila and west Bengal state of India on the north, Khetlal, Akkelpur and Badalgachhi upazilas on the south, Kalai and Khetlal upazilas on the east, Dhamoirhat upazila and West Bengal state of India on the west.

Demographics
According to the 2001 Bangladesh census, Akkelpur had a population of 128952; male 65269, female 63683; Muslim 120129, Hindu 7658, Buddhist 24 and others 1141. Indigenous communities such as santal and munda belong to this upazila.

At the 1991 Bangladesh census, Akkelpur had a population of 126,046, in 24,475 households. Males constituted 52.9% of the population, and females 47.1%. The population aged 18 or older was 68,033. Akkelpur had an average literacy rate of 34% (7+ years), against the national average of 32.4%.

Administration
Akkelpur,  formed as a Thana in 1972, was turned into an upazila on 15 February 1983.

Akkelpur Upazila is divided into Akkelpur Municipality and five union parishads: Gopinathpur, Raikali, Rukindipur, Sonamukhi, and Tilakpur. The union parishads are subdivided into 116 mauzas and 145 villages.

Akkelpur Municipality is subdivided into 9 wards and 15 mahallas.

See also
Upazilas of Bangladesh
Districts of Bangladesh
Divisions of Bangladesh

References

Upazilas of Joypurhat District